Lady Norah Beatrice Henriette Bradley-Birt VA (née Spencer-Churchill; 1 September 1875 – 28 April 1946) was an English aristocrat and educationalist. She, along with her husband Francis Bradley Bradley-Birt, are known for their writings and social work for India.

Siblings
 Lady Frances Spencer-Churchill (1870–1954)
 Charles Spencer-Churchill, 9th Duke of Marlborough (1871–1934)
 Lady Lilian Spencer-Churchill (1873–1951)

References

1875 births
1946 deaths
Daughters of British dukes
Norah
Ladies of the Royal Order of Victoria and Albert
20th-century British women writers